Voskresenovka is a rural locality (a station) in Voskresenovsky Selsoviet of Mikhaylovsky District, Amur Oblast, Russia. The population was 98 as of 2018. There are 4 streets.

Geography 
The village is located 30 km from Poyarkovo.

References 

Rural localities in Mikhaylovsky District, Amur Oblast